François-Marc Gagnon  was a Canadian art historian and professor at Concordia University in Montreal. He was a Fellow of the Royal Society of Canada and a member of the Order of Canada.

He is the author of three books published by the Art Canada Institute: Paul-Émile Borduas: Life & Work (2014); Louis Nicolas: Life & Work (2017); and Jean Paul Riopelle: Life & Work (2019).

References

1935 births
Fellows of the Royal Society of Canada
Members of the Order of Canada
Academic staff of Concordia University
Canadian art historians
French art historians
2019 deaths